Patrick Haag (born 9 March 1990) is a German footballer who plays for TuS Mechtersheim.

References

External links

1990 births
Living people
German footballers
Karlsruher SC II players
SV Waldhof Mannheim players
SSV Jahn Regensburg players
2. Bundesliga players
3. Liga players
Association football midfielders
Sportspeople from Ludwigshafen
Footballers from Rhineland-Palatinate